This page is a comparison of electronic design automation (EDA) software which is used today to design the near totality of electronic devices. Modern electronic devices are too complex to be designed without the help of a computer. Electronic devices may consist of integrated circuits (ICs), printed circuit boards (PCBs), field programmable gate arrays (FPGAs) or a combination of them. Integrated circuits may consist of a combination of digital and analog circuits. These circuits can contain a combination of transistors, resistors, capacitors or specialized components such as analog neural networks, antennas or fuses.

The design of each of these electronic devices generally proceeds from a high- to a low-level of abstraction. For FPGAs the low-level description consists of a binary file to be flashed into the gate array, while for an integrated circuit the low-level description consists of a layout file which describes the masks to be used for lithography inside a foundry.

Each design step requires specialized tools, and many of these tools can be used for designing multiple types of electronic circuits. For example, a program for high-level digital synthesis can usually be used both for IC digital design as well as for programming an FPGA. Similarly, a tool for schematic-capture and analog simulation can generally be used both for IC analog design and for PCB design.

In the case of integrated circuits (ICs) for example, a single chip may contain today more than  20 billion transistors (which is more than two transistors for every human on Earth) and, as a general rule, every single transistor in a chip must work as intended. Since a single VLSI mask set can cost up to 10-100 millions, trial and error approaches are not economically viable. To minimize the risk of any design mistakes, the design flow is heavily automatized. EDA software assists the designer in every step of the design process and every design step is accompanied by heavy test phases. Errors may be present in the high-level code already, such as for the Pentium FDIV floating-point unit bug, or it can be inserted all the way down to physical synthesis, such as a missing wire, or a  timing violation.

Comparison of proprietary EDA software

Mainstream EDA software bundles for ICs design
The world of electronic design automation (EDA) software for integrated circuit (IC) design is dominated by the three vendors Synopsys, Cadence Design Systems and Mentor Graphics which have a revenue respectively of 4,2 billion US$, 3 billion US$ and 1,3 billion US$. Mentor Graphics has been acquired in 2017 by Siemens.

These vendors offer software bundles which allow to cover the full spectrum of IC design, from HDL synthesis to physical synthesis and verification.

The development of EDA software is tightly connected with the development of  technology nodes. The properties of a specific semiconductor foundry, such as the transistor models, the physical characteristics and the design rules, are usually encoded in file formats which are proprietary to one or more EDA vendors. This set of files constitutes the process design kit (PDK) and it is usually developed as a joint effort between the foundry and an EDA vendor. Foundries therefore usually release PDKs which are compatible only for one specific EDA bundle. The information contained inside PDKs is usually considered confidential. PDKs are therefore usually protected by non disclosure agreements (NDAs) and may be shipped in an incomplete or in an encrypted form to the designers.

Proprietary software for electrical simulation (analog/mixed-signal/electromagnetic)

Comparison of proprietary software for PCB design

Comparison of free software EDA tools

Free software EDA bundles for IC design
 Free and open-source EDA software bundles are currently under fast development mainly thanks to the DARPA and Googles openROAD project. The OpenROAD project offers a complete stack of tools from high-level synthesis down to layout generation 
The flow includes Yosys for logic synthesis, OpenLane for physical synthesis and targets the SkyWater 130nm PDK. The flow is currently utilized to submit design for gratis fabrication at Google.

Free software for high-level synthesis
High-level synthesis software can generally be used for the design of both application-specific integrated circuits (ASICs) and field-programmable gate arrays (FPGAs). Most high-level synthesis software is used to edit and verify code written in one of the mainstream hardware description languages (HDL) like VHDL or Verilog. Other tools instead operate at a higher level of abstraction and allow to synthesize HDL code starting from languages like Chisel or SpinalHDL. The higher abstraction of such languages enables formal verification of HDL code.

Free software for IC physical synthesis and layout
This list does not include schematic editors or simulators since these can generally be used both for Integrated Circuits (ICs) and for Printed Circuit Board (PCB) as long as device models are available.

Free software for schematic editing and analog/mixed-signal simulation

Free software for PCB design

See also 
 Electronic Design Automation (EDA)
 List of EDA companies
 List of free electronics circuit simulators
 Schematic editor
 SPICE, a general purpose analog circuit simulator.
 TopoR

References 

Software comparisons